Straight Outta Cashville is the debut studio album by American rapper Young Buck, released on August 24, 2004 by G-Unit Records and Interscope Records.

Background
Straight Outta Cashville title alludes to the N.W.A album, Straight Outta Compton, and is a neologism for Nashville, (Buck's hometown).

The singles from this album include "Let Me In", (featuring 50 Cent), "Shorty Wanna Ride", and "Stomp", (featuring The Game and Ludacris). The album features several rappers "outside" of the G-Unit camp, such as Lil' Flip, David Banner, D-Tay, Stat Quo, and others. The album also features production from Lil Jon, Kon Artis, and Klasic from The Bullets Production Team, along with others.

Straight Outta Cashville received minimal promotion after November 2004 as result of the VIBE award incident, in which Buck was arrested for an assault. Though the case was eventually dropped, four months had passed by since Buck himself had been able to promote the album.

Critical reception

Straight Outta Cashville received generally positive reviews from music critics. Rafael Martinez of Prefix called the record "the best G-Unit release to date", giving praise to the production, featured guests and Buck delivering above-average lyricism from the hip-hop blueprint, concluding that "Cynics will criticize Straight Outta Cashville as another typical G-Unit album, only this time south of the Mason-Dixon Line. But Buck is more than just a 50 flunky and can hold down an album on his own. You can’t argue with success: G-Unit is running this." Kelefa Sanneh from The New York Times said, "This album isn't revelatory, but it is convincing, and although Young Buck's subject matter never surprises, the tracks sometimes do." Jon Caramanica, writing for Rolling Stone, praised Buck for lyrically holding his own opposite the featured artists on a solid debut effort, saying that "Straight Outta Cashville is crime rap par excellence – unrepentantly grimy lyrics backed by soulful production." Robert Christgau graded the album as a "dud", indicating "a bad record whose details rarely merit further thought."

Sales and certifications
In its first week of release, Straight Outta Cashville debuted at number 3 on the Billboard 200 chart with sales of 261,000 copies behind R. Kelly's Happy People/U Saved Me which sold 264,000 copies. The album has since been certified Platinum by the RIAA.

Track listing

Samples
"Prices On My Head"
"If You Were My Woman" by Latimore
"Soulja's Story" by 2Pac
"Bonafide Hustler"
"If Loving You Is Wrong (I Don't Want to Be Right)" by Bobby "Blue" Bland
"Bang, Bang"
"Bang, Bang" by Nancy Sinatra
"Thou Shall"
"Smokey Rainclouds" by Andrey Vinogradov
"Black Gloves"
"Que Protesten" by Chucho Avellanet
"Walk With Me"
"If It's In You To Do Wrong" by The Impressions

Charts

Weekly charts

Year-end charts

Certifications

References

External links 
 
 
 

2004 albums
G-Unit Records albums
Young Buck albums
Albums produced by Lil Jon
Albums produced by Mr. Porter
Albums produced by Dre & Vidal
Albums produced by DJ Paul
Albums produced by Juicy J